Ben Cherski (October 29, 1929 – May 19, 2017) was a Canadian ice hockey player. He played from 1951 to 1955 at the University of North Dakota. He was three times an All-American in ice hockey and holds a record of seven hat tricks in one season (1953–54 season) and 17 all-time. He has 188 points all-time in his career. In 1978, he was inducted into the University of North Dakota Letterwinners Association Hall of Fame. He died in California in 2017.

Awards and honors

References

External links

1929 births
2017 deaths
North Dakota Fighting Hawks men's ice hockey players
Ice hockey people from Edmonton
Canadian ice hockey centres
AHCA Division I men's ice hockey All-Americans